JZL195 is a potent inhibitor of both fatty acid amide hydrolase (FAAH) and monoacylglycerol lipase (MAGL), the primary enzymes responsible for degrading the endocannabinoids anandamide (AEA) and 2-arachidonoylglycerol (2-AG), respectively.

See also 
 JZL184
 JNJ-42165279

References 

Carbamates
Piperazines
Nitrobenzenes
Cannabinoids